Adrianus "Arie" Klaase (23 September 1903 – 20 November 1983) was a Dutch long-distance runner. He competed in the men's 5000 metres at the 1928 Summer Olympics.

References

1903 births
1983 deaths
Athletes (track and field) at the 1928 Summer Olympics
Dutch male long-distance runners
Olympic athletes of the Netherlands
Place of birth missing
20th-century Dutch people